Viktor Ryzhenkov (born 25 August 1966) is an Uzbekistani former track and field athlete who competed for the Soviet Union in pole vault. His career briefly flourished around 1990 and 1991.

Following a second-place finish at the Soviet Indoor Athletics Championships, Ryzhenkov was then chosen to represent the Soviet Union at the 1991 IAAF World Indoor Championships.

Ryzhenkov's mark made him the second best performer in the world that indoor season. He continued to compete on the circuit alongside Bubka and placed third in Malmö while his countryman again broke the world record.

Ryzhenkov's personal best ranks him within the top twenty all-time performers in the indoor pole vault. He did not compete internationally after the dissolution of the Soviet Union at the end of 1991.

References

External links

Living people
1966 births
Uzbekistani male pole vaulters
Soviet male pole vaulters